Badlay ibn Sa'ad ad-Din II (also known as Sihab ad-Din Ahmad Badlay, Arwe Badlay – "Badlay the Beast" (died 1445) was a Sultan of the Sultanate of Adal and a son of Sa'ad ad-Din II.  Brought numerous Christian lands under Muslim rule and contributed to expanding Adal's reach and power in the region.  The polity under Sultan Badlay controlled the territory stretching from port city of Suakin in Sudan to covering the whole Afar plains to the Shewa and Chercher Mountains to include significant portions of Somaliland. Sultanate of Mogadishu was also tributary state of Adal under Badlay.

Reign

After succeeding his brother Jamal Ad-Din, Sultan Badlay moved the capital of Adal to Dakkar (a few miles southeast of Harar) upon his ascension; Richard Pankhurst states that he founded that town. 

In the next few years he continued his predecessor's policy of confrontation with the Christian Ethiopian Empire and he carried out several successful expeditions and succeeded in capturing the province of Bale.  He brought numerous Christian lands under his rule, and burnt many of their towns, Al-Maqrizi says, and he burnt many churches in the Christian Ethiopian lands. He also killed many Christian leaders, and seized their inhabitants, together with much booty. He and his men collected a great deal of wealth, in gold, silver, clothes and armour, as well as many slaves.
 
Then in 1443, he invaded the Ethiopian province of Dawaro, and again in 1445, before Emperor Zara Yaqob defeated and killed him in the Battle of Gomit. The Royal Chronicle of Zara Yaqob reports that the Emperor cut Badlay's body into pieces and sent the parts to different parts of his realm: his head to a place called "Amba", and other parts of his body to Axum, Manhadbe (possibly the Manadeley Francisco Álvares visited in the 1520s), Wasel (near modern Dessie), Jejeno (likely Mekane Selassie), Lawo (possibly Lawo Gabaya), and Wiz (location unknown). In retaliation for the death and dismemberment of Badlay, the Mamluk Sultan of Egypt ordered the patriarch of Alexandria to be tortured and threatened to execute him. The situation would eventually be defused when Yaqob freed an imprisoned Egyptian envoy.

See also
Walashma dynasty

Notes 

Sultans of the Adal Sultanate
15th-century monarchs in Africa
1445 deaths
Year of birth unknown
15th-century Somalian people